A eurodistrict is a European administrative entity that contains urban agglomerations which lie  across the border between two or more states. A eurodistrict offers a program for cooperation and integration of the towns or communes which it comprises: for example, improving transport links for people who live and work on different sides of the border. Furthermore, it confers a trans-national regional identity and represents European integration.

The first Eurodistricts created or currently undergoing creation are:
 Strasbourg-Ortenau
 Freiburg im Breisgau-Centre et Sud Alsace (i.e. Haut-Rhin)
 Lille-Kortrijk-Tournai (Eurometropolis)
 Saar-Moselle
 Basel-Lörrach-St. Louis-Weil am Rhein
 Greater Copenhagen and Skåne

They may be established:
 by a simple agreement about common projects in the area;
 in a more institutionalised manner by a local association for transfrontier or cross-border cooperation (in French: groupement local de coopération transfrontalière or GLCT), which can draw up plans for transfrontier cooperation between towns or communes; or
 with an even greater degree of institutionalisation, perhaps including structures allowing a transfer of power and elected by all district citizens. This has constitutional implications for the individual countries involved, which have to be taken into account when drawing up agreements.

Note that transfrontier cooperation methods between regions known as euroregions exist in parallel to eurodistricts, which are generally urban. Furthermore, a eurodistrict can be located within a euroregion and even have certain connections with it.

The term eurodistrict is quite new (text written 2006) and has not been defined by organisations like the Council of Europe or the  European Union.

An important reason to introduce the Schengen Agreement is to simplify work commuting within such border crossing built-up areas.

See also
 France–Germany relations
 Euroregion

References

External links
Council of Europe document on Transfrontier Cooperation (October 2005)
Eurodistrict Region Freiburg/ Centre et Sud Alsace
FC EURODISTRICT e.V.

Eurodistricts